The mixed relay competition of the triathlon events at the 2019 Pan American Games was held on July 29 at the Agua Dulce in Lima, Peru.

Schedule
All times are Peru Time (UTC-5).

Results
10 nations were scheduled to compete.

References

Triathlon at the 2019 Pan American Games
Triathlon 2019